Abhishek Mishra (born 29 August 1977) is an Indian politician and a former member of the legislative assembly of Uttar Pradesh. Prof. Abhishek Mishra is an ex-Cabinet Minister of Uttar Pradesh who represented UP in GST Council. Currently he is the National Secretary and Spokesperson of Samajwadi Party. He was a faculty of Business Policy Area (Strategy & Innovation) in IIM Ahmedabad. He completed PhD & MPhil in Strategy & Marketing from University of Cambridge (in collaboration with MIT, USA) and MSc. in Management from Glasgow, U.K.

He was elected to 16th state assembly election in 2012 for a five year term. He represented Samajwadi Party. Abhishek Mishra has a PhD in strategy and marketing from Cambridge. He has served the Home and Defence ministries as their consultant for the Sixth Pay Commission and trained batches of IAS and IPS officers, apart from working with various multinationals. He is one of the most prominent Brahmin leaders of Uttar Pradesh. He has recently been given an MLA ticket from Sarojini Nagar seat in Lucknow. Prof. Mishra recently emphasised the importance of social media in the Uttar Pradesh Elections Campaigning.

References

Uttar Pradesh MLAs 2012–2017
Living people
1977 births
Politicians from Lucknow
Samajwadi Party politicians from Uttar Pradesh